Charles (26 December 1446 – 24 May 1472), Duke of Berry, later Duke of Normandy and Duke of Aquitaine, was a son of Charles VII, King of France. He spent most of his life in conflict with his elder brother, King Louis XI.

Early life
Charles was born at Tours, last child and fourth son of Charles VII and Marie of Anjou. As his elder brother, the Dauphin Louis, had repeatedly run into conflict with his father and since 1456 was living in exile at the court of Burgundy, some expected the crown to pass to Charles. When Charles VII died in 1461, however, Louis XI succeeded nonetheless.

After his accession, Louis XI granted his younger brother the Duchy of Berry as an appanage. Dissatisfied with this, Charles joined with Charles, Count of Charolais, and other powerful nobles such as Francis II, Duke of Brittany in the League of the Public Weal in May 1465 and they placed him at the head of their league. This started a rebellion which ended in October with the Treaty of Conflans between Louis XI and the Count of Charolais.

Duke of Normandy
Under the treaty, Charles was granted the Duchy of Normandy as an additional appanage. He proved unable to control his new possession and ran into conflict with his former ally Francis II of Brittany. Louis dispatched the royal army to Normandy and assumed direct royal control of the Duchy. Charles, now reconciled with Duke Francis, fled to Brittany, where he remained until September 1468, when he and Francis signed the Treaty of Ancenis with Louis, promising to abandon the former Count of Charolais, now Duke of Burgundy.

In October 1468 Louis was imprisoned by Charles of Burgundy during a conference at Péronne. In order to obtain his release, Louis agreed to grant Champagne to his brother as compensation for Normandy. Once free, Louis reneged on the promises made under duress but in April 1469, he finally reconciled with his brother, granting him the Duchy of Aquitaine, recently won back from the Kings of England in 1453. Thenceforth Charles quartered the royal arms of France (differenced by a bordure engrailed gules) with one of the three lions of Plantagenet, to signify the duchy.

Charles also agreed with the Duke of Burgundy to marry the latter's only child and heir, Mary of Burgundy. Louis had no intention of allowing a union between his brother and his enemy's daughter and dispatched envoys to Pope Paul II to ensure that the necessary dispensation, required on grounds of consanguinity, was not granted. Louis was unsuccessful in this endeavour, as the Pope granted the dispensation.

Still, the marriage plan came to nothing as Charles died at Bordeaux in May 1472, probably from a combination of tuberculosis and a venereal disease contracted from his mistress Colette de Chambes, the widow of Louis d'Amboise, Viscount of Thouars.

Since Charles left no legitimate issue, his apanage returned to the crown.

His daughter by Colette, Anne bâtarde de Valois, died childless not long after her marriage in 1490 to François de Volvire, Baron of Russec.

Ancestry

Coats of arms

References

Sources

|-

|-

|-

 

1446 births
1472 deaths
15th-century Dukes of Normandy
People from Tours, France
House of Valois
Heirs presumptive to the French throne
Dukes of Berry
15th-century peers of France
Sons of kings